Les Fontinettes station (French: Gare des Fontinettes) is a railway station in Calais, France. It is on a triangular junction, where the Coudekerque-Branche–Fontinettes railway, Lille–Fontinettes railway and Boulogne–Calais railway all meet. Some trains pass through the station twice, before and after calling at Calais-Ville.

The station is served by TER Hauts-de-France trains travelling from Calais-Ville to Hazebrouck, Dunkirk and Boulogne. It has four platforms.

References

External links

Railway stations in Pas-de-Calais
Buildings and structures in Calais

ca:Calais#Transports